Manors station may refer to one of two stations in Newcastle-upon-Tyne, England:

Manors railway station
Manors Metro station